The women's 100 metres hurdles at the 2018 European Athletics Championships took place at the Olympic Stadium on 8 and 9 August.

Records

Schedule

Results

Round 1
First 3 in each heat (Q) and the next fastest 2 (q) advance to the Semifinals. 13 fastest entrants awarded bye to Semifinals.

Semifinals

First 2 (Q) and next 2 fastest (q) qualify for the final.

*Athletes who received a bye to the semifinals

Final

Wind: -0.5 m/s

References

100 metres hurdles W
Sprint hurdles at the European Athletics Championships
Euro